WWT Caerlaverock is wetland nature reserve in southwest Scotland, one of ten reserves in Britain operated by the Wildfowl and Wetlands Trust founded by Sir Peter Scott.

It covers a  site at Eastpark Farm, on the north shore of the Solway Firth to the south of Dumfries. It is a wild nature reserve with a network of screened approaches and several observation towers. There is a visitor centre and farmhouse accommodation. The site received 16,105 visitors in 2019.

Caerlaverock is home to one of only two UK populations of the "living fossil" Triops cancriformis, the horseshoe shrimp. It is also home to the UK's most northerly population of the natterjack toad.

Almost the entire Svalbard population of barnacle goose overwinters in the Solway Firth area, with many of the birds often at Caerlaverock for part or all of the winter; their protection by the reserve has enabled the population to recover from just 500 birds in the 1940s, to over 25,000 now.
 In 2016 the peak count on the reserve was 15,980 in October. Other high counts of wildfowl that year included 221 whooper swan, 2,457 Northern pintail, 3,000 Eurasian teal, 1,230 Eurasian wigeon and 150 greater scaup. These numbers attract raptors such as peregrine falcon, common buzzard and hen harrier. Vagrant birds recorded on the reserve include common crane, long-billed dowitcher, red-breasted goose, snow goose, ring-necked duck and white-tailed plover.

In January 2002, a new education centre was officially opened by King Harald V of Norway.

A pair of ospreys have nested on the reserve since 2005. Their nest can be observed by webcam through the reserve's web-site during the day in the nesting season (April–August). At other times the webcam shows the whooper pond or a barn owl nest.

See also

 Caerlaverock Castle
 Caerlaverock NNR

References

External links
WWT Caerlaverock website

Caerlaverock
Nature reserves in Scotland
Nature centres in Scotland
Tourist attractions in Dumfries and Galloway
Protected areas of Dumfries and Galloway